The 2021 World Junior Ice Hockey Championships (2021 WJHC) were the 45th edition of the Ice Hockey World Junior Championship. It began on December 25, 2020, and ended with the gold medal game on January 5, 2021. This marked the 16th time that Canada hosted the WJIHC. Due to the COVID-19 pandemic in Canada, it was hosted in a "bubble" behind closed doors in Edmonton, Alberta, with no spectators admitted for any game.

Background
On December 6, 2018, it was announced that Edmonton and Red Deer, in the province of Alberta, would be the host cities. It was the third time Edmonton has hosted the tournament, after previously hosting in 1995 and 2012, and the first to use Rogers Place as a venue.

Due to the COVID-19 pandemic, the IIHF cancelled all lower-division U20 championships on September 17, 2020 (thus there was no promotion or relegation), and announced that the top division tournament would be hosted solely by Edmonton using a "bubble" strategy similar to what was used for the NHL's 2020 Stanley Cup playoffs in Edmonton and Toronto. This decision resulted in the elimination of Red Deer as the secondary host city of the 2021 tournament. All games were held behind closed doors with no outside spectators. It was subsequently announced that Edmonton and Red Deer would host the 2022 tournament, and that Gothenburg, Sweden would be shifted from 2022 to 2024.

On October 19, 2020, the full schedule for the tournament was announced, with play beginning on Christmas for the first time since the 2004–05 edition.

On November 25, 2020, Hockey Canada suspended its selection camp and quarantined all players for 14 days (retroactive to November 23) due to two positive COVID-19 tests among participants. Swedish head coach Tomas Montén, along with two assistant leaders and players William Eklund, Karl Henriksson, William Wallinder, and Albin Grewe from the Swedish preliminary roster, were forced to leave the team after testing positive for COVID-19 too close to the beginning of the championship.

Team Canada captain Kirby Dach sustained an injury in Canada's pre-tournament game against Russia, and was ruled out for the rest of the tournament.

Nine German players were quarantined under COVID-19 protocols through the first two games due to positive tests prior to the tournament. No new COVID-19 positives were detected within the bubble through the conclusion of the tournament.

Blackhawks prospect and 2020 first rounder and Team Germany forward Lukas Reichel was unable to make the tournament after he tested positive with COVID-19.

Top division

Venue

Officials
The following officials were assigned by the IIHF to officiate the 2021 World Junior Championships. All officials are Canadian due to restrictions from COVID-19 pandemic on travel and ease of getting officials on site.

Referees
  Adam Bloski
  Michael Campbell
  Alexandre Garon
  Olivier Gouin
  Kyle Kowalski
  Guillaume Labonté
  Mike Langin
  Fraser Lawrence
  Kevin Maille
  Mathieu Menniti
  Mark Pearce
  Brett Roeland
  Carter Sandlak
  Tyson Stewart

Linesmen
  Guillaume Brunelle
  Maxime Chaput
  Jonathan Deschamps
  Deion Foster
  Adam Harris
  Brett Mackey
  Kelsey Mahoney
  Matthew Mannella
  Michael McGowan
  Ben O'Quinn
  Nathan Vanoosten
  Tarrington Wyonzek

Seeding
The seedings in the preliminary round are based on the 2020 tournament's final standings using the serpentine system. The IIHF announced the groups on January 5, 2020, with Austria being promoted from Division I A after winning the 2020 Division I A Tournament.

Group A
 (1)
 (4)
 (5)
 (8)
 (9)

Group B
 (2)
 (3)
 (6)
 (7)
 (11-Promoted)

Rosters

Preliminary round
All times are local (UTC-7).

Group A

Group B

Playoff round
Winning teams will be reseeded for the semi-finals in accordance with the following ranking:

higher position in the group
higher number of points
better goal difference
higher number of goals scored for
better seeding coming into the tournament (final placement at the 2020 World Junior Ice Hockey Championships).

Bracket

Quarterfinals

Semifinals

Bronze medal game

Gold medal game

Statistics

Scoring leaders 

GP = Games played; G = Goals; A = Assists; Pts = Points; +/− = Plus–minus; PIM = Penalties In MinutesSource: IIHF

Goaltending leaders 

(minimum 40% team's total ice time)

TOI = Time on ice (minutes:seconds); GA = Goals against; GAA = Goals against average; SA = Shots against; Sv% = Save percentage; SO = ShutoutsSource: IIHF

Final standings

Awards
Best players selected by the directorate:
Best Goaltender:  Devon Levi
Best Defenceman:  Topi Niemelä
Best Forward:  Tim Stützle
Source: IIHF

Media All-Stars:
MVP:  Trevor Zegras
Goaltender:  Devon Levi
Defencemen:  Bowen Byram /  Ville Heinola
Forwards:  Trevor Zegras /  Dylan Cozens /  Tim Stützle
Source: IIHF

Division I
Division I, II, and III games have been cancelled.

Group A
The tournament would have been held in Hørsholm, Denmark, from December 13 to 19, 2020.

 – Promoted from Division I B
 – Relegated from Top Division

Group B
The tournament would have been held in Tallinn, Estonia, from February 10 to 17, 2021.

 – Promoted from Division II A

 – Relegated from Division I A

Division II
Division I, II, and III games have been cancelled.

Group A
The tournament would have been held in Brașov, Romania, from February 8 to 14, 2021.

 – Relegated from Division I B

 – Promoted from Division II B

Group B
The tournament would have been held in Belgrade, Serbia, from February 8 to 14, 2021.

 – Promoted from Division III

 – Relegated from Division II A

Division III
The tournament would have been held in Mexico City, Mexico, from January 10 to 17, 2021., but have been cancelled.

 – Relegated from Division II B

References

External links
 IIHF World Juniors Official Site

 
2021
World Junior Championships
World Junior Championships
World Junior Championships, 2021
World Junior Championships, 2021
Ice hockey competitions in Edmonton
World Junior Ice Hockey Championships, 2021
2020–21 in Canadian ice hockey
21st century in Alberta
World Junior Ice Hockey Championships
World Junior Ice Hockey Championships